The Task Force on Financial Integrity and Economic Development was a unique global coalition of civil society organizations and governments launched in 2009 to address inequalities in the financial system that penalize billions of people. The Task Force was renamed the Financial Transparency Coalition in May 2013.

See also
 Illicit Financial Flows
 Raymond W. Baker

External links
  Official website
  Official blog
 Task Force on Facebook
 Video from the 2011 Task Force Conference in Paris

References

International economic organizations
Non-profit organizations based in Washington, D.C.
Foreign policy and strategy think tanks in the United States